The Denmark women's national basketball team represents Denmark in international women's basketball competition. The team is controlled by the Danish Basketball Association (DBBF).

See also
 Denmark women's national under-19 basketball team
 Denmark women's national under-17 basketball team
 Denmark women's national 3x3 team

References

External links
 Official website of the Danish Basketball Federation
 Denmark National Team - Women Presentation at Eurobasket.com
 Denmark Basketball Records at FIBA Archive

Women's national basketball teams
Basketball teams in Denmark
Women's basketball in Denmark
Basketball